HD 212301 b is an extrasolar planet located approximately 172 light-years (53 parsecs) away in the constellation of Octans, orbiting the star HD 212301. It has an orbital period of 2.25 Earth days. The orbital distance is 0.0341 astronomical units or 5.10 gigameters.

On August 22, 2005, taking place in ESO La Silla Observatory in Chile, the planet was discovered by Lo Curto who used the HARPS spectrometer.

See also
 HD 213240 b

References

External links
 
 

Hot Jupiters
Octans
Exoplanets discovered in 2005
Exoplanets detected by radial velocity

de:HD 212301 b